Eirik Markegård (born 13 February 1984) is a Norwegian footballer who plays as a striker for the Norwegian fifth Division side Jardar. He has previously played for Stabæk and Strømsgodset in Tippeligaen as well as Hønefoss, Sandefjord, Tønsberg and Follo in lower leagues. Markegård was runner-up in the Norwegian Cup in 2010 with Follo.

Career

Hailing from Hemsedal in Buskerud, Markegård was both a talented alpine skier and footballer, but chose to focus on his footballing career in Hemsedal IL before he moved to Stabæk ahead of the 2002 season. He made his Tippeligaen debut in a 4–2 win against Molde on 20 October 2002, replacing Marel Baldvinsson in the 86th minute. He scored his first goal against Brann, on 20 May 2004, only 3 minutes after he came on a substitute. In the 2006 season, Markegård was loaned out to the First Division club Hønefoss. After having scored 8 goals in 19 games, he chose to return to Stabæk to try to oust Tippeligaen top two strikers, Veigar Páll Gunnarsson and Daniel Nannskog.

Markegård scored six goals in his 42 matches for Stabæk, and after his contract with the club expired he joined Sandefjord Fotball on a free transfer ahead of the 2008 season. After playing 14 matches and scoring 2 goals for Sandefjord on the second tier, He was loaned out to third-tier club FK Tønsberg in the 2009 season. In March 2010 he was released from the contract with Sandefjord and was signed by Follo, where he scored 13 goals in 27 games in the 2010 season. After missing the first round of the 2010 Norwegian Cup, he scored six goals in the next five rounds, which made him top goal-scorer in the cup that year, and was a key contributor as Follo came to the final, where they lost to Strømsgodset. After the final, Follo was relegated to the Second Division, and Markegård was released from his contract. He was wanted by Sandnes Ulf, but signed for Strømsgodset

Despite scoring a lot of goals for Strømsgodset's reserve team in the Second Division, he did not get a lot of chances for the first team in Tippeligaen. In March 2012 he was released by the club, and Markegård moved back to Follo. Markegård won promotion to the First Division with Follo in 2012, and half-way through the 2013 season he joined the Second Division side Bærum where he signed a contract till the end of the season.

Career statistics

Honours
 Top scorer, Norwegian Cup: 2010
 Top scorer, 2. divisjon/1: 2009
 Top scorer, 2. divisjon/4: 2012

References

1984 births
Living people
People from Hemsedal
Norwegian footballers
Stabæk Fotball players
Hønefoss BK players
Sandefjord Fotball players
FK Tønsberg players
Follo FK players
Strømsgodset Toppfotball players
Bærum SK players
Eliteserien players
Norwegian First Division players
Association football forwards
Sportspeople from Viken (county)